The Anomoanon is an American rock music group formed in 1997 by Ned Oldham, Aram Stith, Jason Stith, Jack Carneal, Willy MacLean, and David Heumann.

Discography
The Anomoanon

 Hello My / The Free Web (7") (1997) Palace Records
 Mother Goose (1998) Palace Records
  Summer Never Ends (EP/CD) (1999) Palace Records
 Portland / Now Is The Season (7") (1999) Low Fly Records
 De Avonden XMAS 1999 (compilation) (1999) VPRO
 Songs From Robert Louis Stevenson's "A Child's Garden Of Verses" (1999) Palace Records
 The Anomoanon (2001) Palace Records
 Envoi Villon (12") (2002) Galaxia Records
 Asleep Many Years In The Wood (2002) Temporary Residence
 Portrait Of John Entwistle (10") (2003) Western Vinyl
 Joji (2004)  Temporary Residence
 The Derby Ram (2004) September Gurls
 Everything Comes & Goes: a Tribute to Black Sabbath (2005) Temporary Residence
 Not Alone (2006) Durtro Jnana
 Thankful (2006) Temporary Residence

Ned Oldham

 Ned Oldham - Let's Go Out Tonight (2010) Gold Robot
 Old Calf - Borrow A Horse (2011) No Quarter
 Ned Oldham - Further Gone (2014) No Quarter
 Shirley Collins Inspired...  (Ned Oldham) (2014) Burning Bridges & Fifth Column Films
 Ned Oldham - New Year Carol (2015)

References

American rock music groups